Cowichan Valley is a provincial electoral district in British Columbia, Canada, established by the Electoral Districts Act, 2008 out of parts of Cowichan-Ladysmith and Malahat-Juan de Fuca. It was first contested in the 2009 general election in which New Democrat Bill Routley was elected MLA.

Geography
Cowichan Valley is located on southern Vancouver Island, in the region surrounding the Cowichan River.  Communities in the electoral district consist of Duncan, Lake Cowichan, Shawnigan Lake, Mill Bay, Cobble Hill, Maple Bay, and the southern portion of North Cowichan.

History

Election results

References

British Columbia provincial electoral districts on Vancouver Island
Duncan, British Columbia
2008 establishments in British Columbia